The 2003 Neiva bombing was a major bomb attack carried out by Revolutionary Armed Forces of Colombia (FARC) rebels in the city of Neiva, Colombia on February 14, 2003. Sixteen people died and a dozen others were injured after the explosion of a car bomb near Benito Salas Airport. Police claimed FARC tried to blow up a plane carrying President Álvaro Uribe who was flying overhead. Nine police officers were among those who died. The explosive charge of the blast was 330-440 pounds.

Police discovered the plot and raided the house. Because of this the terrorists decided to detonate the bomb at that moment instead, thus missing the President in the plane. The powerful blast managed to destroy five nearby houses and damaged 30 more.

On the same day, two CIA operatives were captured by the guerillas in Colombia, whilst two others were thought to have been assassinated.

See also
2003 El Nogal Club bombing
2003 Zona Rosa attacks

References

2003 murders in Colombia
Explosions in 2003
FARC actions
February 2003 crimes
Huila Department
Improvised explosive device bombings in South America
Mass murder in Colombia
Terrorist incidents in Colombia
Terrorist incidents in South America in 2003
Terrorist incidents in Colombia in the 2000s
Massacres committed by FARC